Avlabari ( Avlabari,  Havlabar) is a neighborhood of Old Tbilisi on the left bank (east side) of the Kura River. The 11th-13th century chronicles mention it as Isani, which is now one of the larger municipal regions of Tbilisi. Nowadays one of the upcoming hip neighborhoods of the city, Avlabari is being extensively gentrified.

The Armenian community 

Avlabari ( Havlabar) was long known as the center of Armenian life of Tbilisi.
The Armenian Pantheon of Tbilisi is located in Avlabari. Until recently Avlabari was populated heavily by Armenians, but recently their number have diminished.

Churches 
The churches in the Avlabari district include:
 The Holy Trinity Cathedral of Tbilisi - the third-tallest Eastern Orthodox cathedral in the world
 The Metekhi Church - the oldest church in Avlabari
 Church of the Red Gospel, Tbilisi, a ruined 18th century Armenian Apostolic Church
 Ejmiatsin Church, Tbilisi, an 18th-century Armenian church near Avlabari Square

Transportation
The neighborhood is served by the Avlabari metro station.

Notable residents
Arshak Ter-Gukasov, Russian-Armenian general (1819-1881)
Nikol Aghbalian, Armenian public figure and historian (1875-1947)

Gallery

References 

Neighborhoods of Tbilisi